Charles A. Zunker (August 23, 1908 – June 11, 1963) was an American football tackle who played one season in the National Football League (NFL) for the Cincinnati Reds and one in the American Football League (AFL) for the Dallas Rams. He played college football for Texas State.

Zunker was born on August 23, 1908, in Hanley, Texas. He attended San Marcos Baptist Academy before playing college football for Texas State University. He was a member of Texas State from 1928 to 1931, being named all-conference as a senior.

Two years after graduating college, Zunker was signed to play professional football in the National Football League (NFL) by the Cincinnati Reds. He appeared in three games with the Reds before leaving for the American Football League (AFL). The Reds were one of the worst teams in the league, folding mid-season after compiling an 0–8 record. He wore number 47 with Cincinnati, and played the tackle position.

In the AFL, he appeared in eight games with the Dallas Rams while serving as team foreman. He later was a contractor and also officiated some high school football games. Zunker died on June 11, 1963, at the age of 54.

References

1908 births
1963 deaths
Players of American football from Texas
American football tackles
Texas State Bobcats football players
Cincinnati Reds (NFL) players